The 2004 British Speedway Championship was the 44th edition of the British Speedway Championship. The Final took place on 7 July at Oxford Stadium in Oxford, England. The Championship was won by Joe Screen, who beat David Norris, Mark Loram and Scott Nicholls in the final heat.

Final 
7 July 2004
 Oxford Stadium, Oxford

{| width=100%
|width=50% valign=top|

Qualifying

Final

See also 
 British Speedway Championship

References 

British Speedway Championship
Great Britain